This is a list of Armenia women's international footballers who have played for the Armenia women's national football team.

Players

See also 
 Armenia women's national football team

References 

 
International footballers
International footballers
Armenia
Football in Armenia
Association football player non-biographical articles